Marco Jakobs (sometimes spelled Marco Jacobs, born 30 May 1974 in Unna, North Rhine-Westphalia) is a German bobsledder who competed in the 1990s. At the 1998 Winter Olympics in Nagano, he won a gold medal in the four-man event with teammates Christoph Langen, Markus Zimmermann and Olaf Hampel.

Jakobs also won a gold medal in the two-man event at the 2001 FIBT World Championships in St. Moritz.

References
 Bobsleigh four-man Olympic medalists for 1924, 1932-56, and since 1964
 Bobsleigh two-man world championship medalists since 1931
 DatabaseOlympics.com profile

1974 births
Living people
People from Unna
Sportspeople from Arnsberg (region)
German male discus throwers
German male bobsledders
Bobsledders at the 1998 Winter Olympics
Olympic bobsledders of Germany
Olympic gold medalists for Germany
Olympic medalists in bobsleigh
Medalists at the 1998 Winter Olympics